Maurizio Ragano (died 1640) was a Roman Catholic prelate who served as Bishop of Fondi (1636–1640).

Biography
On 7 April 1636, Maurizio Ragano was appointed during the papacy of Pope Urban VIII as Bishop of Fondi.
On 13 April 1636, he was consecrated bishop by Ciriaco Rocci, Cardinal-Priest of San Salvatore in Lauro, with Domenico Ravenna, Bishop of Nicastro, and Ottavio Orsini, Bishop of Segni, serving as co-consecrators. 
He served as Bishop of Fondi until his death in 1640.

References 

17th-century Italian Roman Catholic bishops
Bishops appointed by Pope Urban VIII
1640 deaths